"The Corner of My Life" is a single by American country music artist Bill Anderson. Released in June 1973, it was the second single from his album Bill. The song peaked at number 2 on the Billboard Hot Country Singles chart. It also reached number 1 on the RPM Country Tracks chart in Canada.

Chart performance

References

1973 singles
Bill Anderson (singer) songs
Songs written by Bill Anderson (singer)
1973 songs
MCA Records singles